The National Rugby League's Magic Round is a weekend where all fixtures are played at one venue. The concept is derived from Super League's Magic Weekend. The first Magic Round, in 2019, was held at Brisbane's Lang Park, in the ninth round of the season, from 9 to 12 May. The Government of Queensland paid approximately $2.1 million per year for the event to be held in the city in 2019 and 2020.

History
England's Super League first held its Magic Weekend in Cardiff, Wales, in 2007, in part as a bid to promote rugby league there. The event has been repeated on an annual basis, staged also in Edinburgh, Manchester, Newcastle upon Tyne and Liverpool. The second-tier Championship followed in 2015 with the Summer Bash, a full round of fixtures that in that year and each subsequent year have been played in Blackpool.

The NRL first announced a Magic Round in 2018, for the 2019 season. It selected Brisbane as the host for 2019 and 2021, with the NRL having the option to continue to hold the event there in 2022 and 2023. The hosting arrangements included an investment from the Government of Queensland. The NRL declared the 2019 event, held from 9 to 12 May, to be a success; the total attendance for the weekend was 134,677.

The second Magic Round was scheduled to be held in May 2020, but was cancelled due to the ongoing impact of the COVID-19 pandemic which affected the 2020 NRL season.

After the success of the second Magic Round in 2021, it was announced that the event would be returning to Brisbane in 2022.

2019: Brisbane

2021: Brisbane

2022: Brisbane

2023: Brisbane 

Bye:  Newcastle Knights

Yearly Attendances

See also

Magic Weekend
Summer Bash

References

External links
 https://www.nrl.com/news/2018/06/17/nrl-brisbane-magic-round-to-be-staged-in-2019-at-suncorp-stadium/
 https://www.nrl.com/news/2018/10/25/sunday-derbies-magic-weekend-headline-2019-draw/
 https://www.nrl.com/news/2019/04/01/magic-acts-for-nrl-magic-round-brisbane/
 https://www.nrl.com/travel/magic-round/
 https://www.foxsports.com.au/nrl/nrl-premiership/nrl-to-stage-magic-round-in-2019/news-story/ff125411f0a80e100cd6cfc4143b4867
 https://suncorpstadium.com.au/The-Venue/Latest-News/NRL-Brisbane-Magic-Round.aspx

National Rugby League
Rugby league club matches
Rugby league in Brisbane